Benjamin Ramon Rowen (born November 15, 1988) is an American professional baseball former pitcher and current scout and coach. He played in Major League Baseball (MLB) for the Texas Rangers, Milwaukee Brewers, and Los Angeles Angels. After his retirement as a player, he joined the Angels organization as an advance scout.

Early life
Rowen was born in Dunedin, Florida to Michael and Darlene Rowen. He lived with his family in East Aurora, New York between the ages of two and nine. The family thereafter moved to California where Michael Rowen worked for Moog Inc.

As a freshman at Palos Verdes High School in Palos Verdes, California, Rowen dropped his arm angle and became a submarine pitcher. After high school he pitched at Los Angeles Harbor College for two years before transferring to Virginia Tech. In 2009, he played collegiate summer baseball with the Cotuit Kettleers of the Cape Cod Baseball League.

Professional career

Texas Rangers
The Texas Rangers selected Rowen in the 22nd round of the 2010 Major League Baseball draft. He made his professional debut for the Spokane Indians that year. In 33 innings pitched he had a 1.09 earned run average and 30 strikeouts.

Pitching for the Hickory Crawdads in 2011, Rowen had a 1.98 ERA and 43 strikeouts in 59 innings. In 2012, while pitching for the Myrtle Beach Pelicans, Rowen was the MiLB Relief Pitcher of the Year. For the season he had a 1.57 ERA, 19 saves and 52 strikeouts in  innings. In 2013, he was invited to the Rangers spring training. He started the season with the Frisco RoughRiders. He was promoted to the Round Rock Express in July.

Rowen was called up to the majors for the first time on June 11, 2014, and he made his major league debut on June 15, pitching a scoreless inning of relief against the Seattle Mariners. In eight appearances out of the bullpen he had a 4.15 ERA. The Rangers designated him for assignment on December 16, 2014 and he was released a few days later.

Baltimore Orioles
Rowen signed a minor league contract with the Los Angeles Dodgers on January 20, 2015, that included an invitation to spring training. The Dodgers assigned him to the Double-A Tulsa Drillers, but before the minor league season started he was traded to the Baltimore Orioles (along with minor league catcher Chris O'Brien) in exchange for Ryan Webb, minor league catcher Brian Ward, and a competitive balance draft pick. He opted out of his contract on July 1, 2015.

Chicago Cubs
Rowen signed a minor league deal with the Chicago Cubs on July 5, 2015. He was called up on July 29, but was designated for assignment two days later without making an appearance.

Toronto Blue Jays
On August 3, 2015, Rowen was claimed off waivers by the Toronto Blue Jays and assigned to the Triple-A Buffalo Bisons. He was invited to Major League spring training, and optioned to minor league camp on March 13. On August 1, 2016 Rowen was designated for assignment.

Milwaukee Brewers
Rowen was claimed off waivers by the Milwaukee Brewers on August 4, 2016. He was outrighted off the 40-man roster on November 9.

New York Mets
Rowen was signed by the New York Mets on December 15, 2016 to a minor-league deal. He elected free agency on November 6, 2017.

Cincinnati Reds
On January 19, 2018, Rowen signed a minor league deal with the Cincinnati Reds.  He was released on May 9, 2018.

Sugar Land Skeeters
On June 3, 2018, Rowen signed with the Sugar Land Skeeters of the Atlantic League of Professional Baseball.

Atlanta Braves
On January 18, 2019, Rowen signed a minor league deal with the Atlanta Braves. On July 19, 2019, he pitched in the Triple-A All-Star Game. He became a free agent on November 2, 2020.

Los Angeles Angels
On December 14, 2020, Rowen signed a minor league deal with the Los Angeles Angels.  On April 12, 2021, Rowen was selected to the active roster. He made his Angels debut that day, his first major league appearance since 2016, throwing 1 shutout inning. After allowing 8 runs in 11.1 innings, Rowen was designated for assignment on May 5. On May 8, after clearing waivers, he was outrighted to the Triple-A Salt Lake Bees. On October 14, Rowen elected free agency.

Post-playing career
On December 10, 2021, Rowen announced his retirement from professional baseball, and joined the Los Angeles Angels in an advanced scouting position.

Pitching style
Rowen pitched with a submarine-style delivery. Rowen threw three pitches: a two-seam fastball, a slider, and a changeup. He was compared to former submarine reliever Chad Bradford due to their low fastball velocity. In 2021, Rowen switched to an overhand pitching delivery.

References

External links

Virginia Tech Hokies bio

1988 births
Living people
People from Rancho Palos Verdes, California
Baseball players from California
Major League Baseball pitchers
Texas Rangers players
Milwaukee Brewers players
Los Angeles Angels players
Los Angeles Harbor Seahawks baseball players
Virginia Tech Hokies baseball players
Cotuit Kettleers players
Spokane Indians players
Hickory Crawdads players
Myrtle Beach Pelicans players
Leones del Caracas players
American expatriate baseball players in Venezuela
Surprise Saguaros players
Frisco RoughRiders players
Round Rock Express players
Bowie Baysox players
Iowa Cubs players
Norfolk Tides players
Buffalo Bisons (minor league) players
Colorado Springs Sky Sox players
Las Vegas 51s players
Sugar Land Skeeters players
Louisville Bats players
Mississippi Braves players
Gwinnett Stripers players
Arizona Complex League Angels players
Salt Lake Bees players